Prashanth Venkataramanujam is an American television writer, actor and producer. Until August 2020, he was the head writer and executive producer for the Netflix series Patriot Act with Hasan Minhaj.

Early and personal life
Venkataramanujam was born on March 12, 1987, in Downers Grove, Illinois, to Tamil immigrant parents from India. His father, Perialwar, left his job at the Tamil Nadu Water Supply and Drainage Board and immigrated to the United States in the late 1970s; he began working as a structural engineer. In 1981, he met and married Usharani. Venkataramanujam has one sister, Preethi. 

Venkataramanujam grew up in Darien, Illinois. He attended the University of Illinois at Urbana–Champaign, where he joined the Chai Town a capella group and appeared as Jacob Winter on the TV series One Fine Day!. He graduated from the school in 2009 with a B.S. in molecular and cellular biology.

Although raised Hindu, Venkatarmanujam is an atheist.

Early career
After graduating, Venkataramanujam worked as a Technology Consultant in Chicago, where he learned many useless skills. He later moved to Los Angeles and began performing standup comedy. While performing at clubs, he met fellow comedian Hasan Minhaj. In 2012, he was a semi-finalist at the San Francisco Comedy Competition. His first break came in 2016 when he wrote Minhaj's speech for the Radio and Television Correspondents' Association. The speech was aired on C-SPAN and went viral, helping to bring both Minhaj and Venkataramanujam to wider attention. In 2017, he was hired to write for Bill Nye Saves the World and was nominated for a Primetime Emmy Award for Outstanding Writing for Nonfiction Programming. The same year, he wrote Minhaj's speech for the White House Correspondents' Association Dinner. He served as an associate producer for the Hasan Minhaj: Homecoming King special, released on Netflix in May 2017.

Patriot Act
In 2018, Minhaj decided to do a new one-man show built around politics and visual media. Venkataramanujam suggested that the format would work better as an episodic television series. Venkataramanujam and Minhaj then co-created the late-night television show Patriot Act with Hasan Minhaj. Venkataramanujam serves as both the series' head writer and executive producer. He is also a producer for the Netflix panel show The Fix, hosted by British-Irish comedian Jimmy Carr.

Awards and honors
2017 Nomination – Primetime Emmy Award for Outstanding Writing for Nonfiction Programming

References

Tamil Brahmins
University of Illinois Urbana-Champaign alumni
American television writers
Television producers from Illinois
American male television actors
American people of Indian Tamil descent
People from Darien, Illinois
1987 births
Living people